= Sabre de cavalerie légère modèle An IX =

Sabre modèle An IX
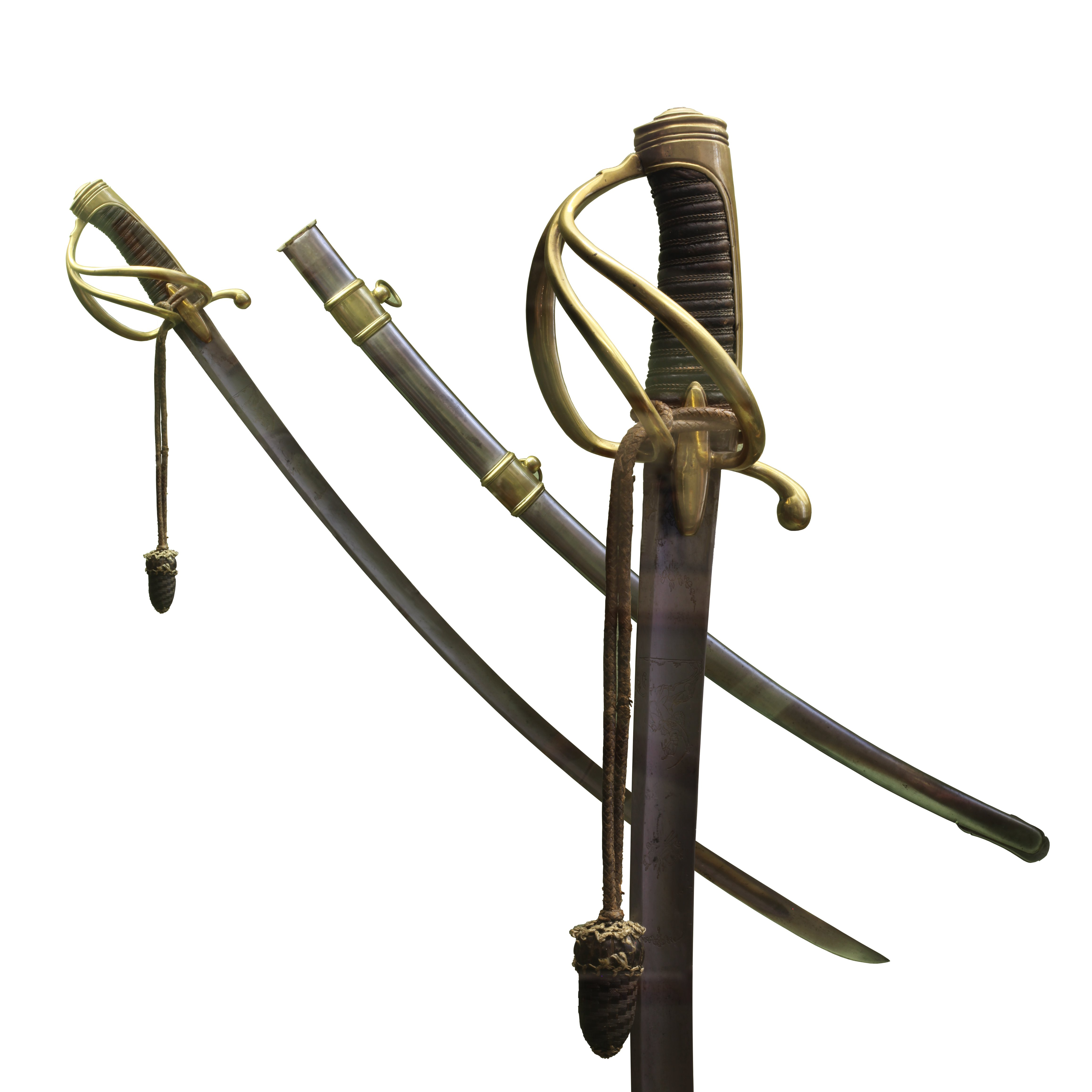
- Type: Light cavalry sabre
- Place of origin: France

Service history
- Wars: Napoleonic Wars

Production history
- Designer: Liorard
- Designed: An VIII (1799 - 1800)
- Manufacturer: Klingenthal

Specifications
- Blade type: curved, 87.9 cm (34.6 in) long, flat back

The Sabre modèle An IX, (lit. 'Sabre, model of the ninth year') was a standard light cavalry sabre in usage in the French Army during the Napoleonic Wars.

== Significance ==
The modèle An IX was the first attempt at standardising cavalry sabres after the French Revolution, during which a disorganised plethora of bladed weapons was produced
